La Quar is a small town and municipality located in the comarca of Berguedà, in Catalonia. The municipality consists mostly of isolated farmhouses, with a few small settlements. The traditional center of the municipality was Santa Maria de la Quar, located on an easily defended rocky outcropping, but today it has no permanent residents and the center of the municipality has become Sant Maurici de la Quar, on the main road.

Geography
La Quar is located in the foothills of the Pyrenees. It is surrounded by peaks of around 1000 meters to the north and west, and although it is quite close —as the raven flies— to the town of Berga, the town can only be accessed from the south. As a result, the town is relatively isolated.

History
The ruins of the Monastery of La Portella are located within the municipality. Formerly, this monastery was quite powerful, and as a result la Quar had been quite important in spite of its low population. The town was also the seat of the important noble family of La Portella.

The first reference to the Monastery of la Portella is from the year 1003, and it was finally abandoned in 1835. From 1838-1840, during the Carlist Wars, the Carlist authorities moved the University of Solsona to the empty monastery for defensive reasons.

At some point a Romanesque sculpture of Virgin and Child, known as the Mare de Déu de la Quar was discovered in the municipality. Healing properties were attributed to the Virgin, and la Quar became a local place of pilgrimage. Today, the Virgin is kept in the church of Sant Maurici, along with many crutches or wax representations of limbs given in thanks to the Virgin by those who have claimed to have been healed by her.

The church of Santa Maria de la Quar was consecrated by Bishop Nantigis of La Seu d'Urgell in 899-900, and the building was extensively refurbished in the 16th century, a time of great endowment for many church buildings as Spain's expanding empire bought great wealth to the area.

References

External links
 Official website 
 Government data pages 

Municipalities in Berguedà
Populated places in Berguedà